Ophrys fusca, commonly known as the sombre bee-orchid or the dark bee-orchid, is a species of orchid native to the Mediterranean from southwestern Europe and northern Africa to western Asia. Most subspecies of the Ophrys fusca are pollinated by males Andrena bees.

Etymology

The genus name Ophrys comes from Greek and means 'eyebrow' - a reference to the hairy fringe of the lip of the flower of many orchids in this genus. The specific epithet fusca means 'dusky' or 'brown', while the subspecies name iricolor refers to the iridescent colouring of the speculum.

Subspecies
The following subspecies are currently recognized:

Ophrys fusca subsp. blitopertha 
Ophrys fusca subsp. cinereophila 
Ophrys fusca subsp. durieui 
Ophrys fusca subsp. funerea 
Ophrys fusca subsp. fusca
Ophrys fusca subsp. iricolor 
Ophrys fusca subsp. pallida

References

External links

fusca
Flora of North Africa
Flora of Southeastern Europe
Flora of Southwestern Europe
Flora of Western Asia
Plants described in 1800